Benzylidene compounds are, formally speaking, derivatives of benzylidene, although few are prepared from the carbene.   Benzylidene acetal is a protecting group in synthetic organic chemistry of the form PhCH(OR)2.  For example, 4,6-O-benzylidene-glucopyranose is a glucose derivative.  Benzylidene is an archaic term for compounds of the type PhCHX2 and PhCH= substituents (Ph = C6H5).  For example, dibenzylideneacetone is (PhCH=CH)2CO.  Benzal chloride, PhCHCl2, is alternatively named benzylidene chloride.

Benzylidene is the molecule C6H5CH.  It is a triplet carbene (CAS RN 3101-08-4).  It is generated by irradiation of phenyldiazomethane.

See also
 Aurone

References

External links

 

Aromatic compounds